This is a list of films which placed number-one at the weekend box office in Brazil during 2018.

Highest-grossing films

References

2018 in Brazil
2018
Brazil